This is a list of persons who have served as justices of the Alaska Supreme Court.

List of justices

Chief justices
The Supreme Court had only one chief justice, Buell Nesbett, during its first decade of existence. Alaska voters approved a constitutional amendment in 1970, months after Nesbett's retirement, which set the current limits for chief justices, namely that they are allowed to serve three-year non-consecutive terms.

Succession of seats

Retention election history
Justices face a retention election in the first regularly scheduled election after they have served three full years, and every ten years thereafter. Only one justice, Harry Arend, has lost a retention election.

References

External links
 Justices of the Alaska Supreme Court

 
Alaska
Justices